Christian Kellner (born 22 November 1975) is a former Austrian  association football player who played at the forward position.

External links
 

1975 births
Living people
Austrian footballers
Association football forwards
FK Austria Wien players
WSG Tirol players
Austrian Football Bundesliga players
SKN St. Pölten players
SV Horn players
Footballers from Vienna
Association football midfielders